Korpe is a small settlement in the hills southwest of Blagovica in the Municipality of Lukovica in the southeast of the Upper Carniola region of Slovenia.

References

External links

Korpe on Geopedia
Korpe on Government Office for Local Self Government and Regional Policy Republic of Slovenia
Korpe at the Municipality of Lukovica
Korpe on Google Maps

Populated places in the Municipality of Lukovica